Kim Clijsters was the defending champion, but did not participate due to her retirement in April.

Anna Chakvetadze won the title, defeating Sania Mirza in the final 6–3, 6–2.

Seeds
The top four seeds received a bye into the second round.

Draw

Finals

Top half

Bottom half

Qualifying

Qualifying seeds

Qualifiers

Qualifying draw

First qualifier

Second qualifier

Third qualifier

Fourth qualifier

References

External links
 Official results archive (ITF)
 Official results archive (WTA)

Singles
Bank of the West Classic
Bank of the West Classic - Singles